Kavre Nitya Chandeswori popularly known as "Kavre" is a village development committee in Kavrepalanchok District in the Bagmati Zone of central Nepal. Two of its V.D.C's are included in Dhulikhel Municipality in the year 2015 A.D. At the time of the 2011 Nepal census it had a population of 4,927 in 1,042 individual households.

This wonderful village is 34.9 km East along Araniko Highway from Kathmandu and 8 km East along B.P. Koirala Highway from Dhulikhel. It takes about 1 hour and 20 minutes max, from Kathmandu(neglecting the road traffic) to reach Kavre. B.P. Koirala Highway passes right through the center of this village. A wide view Himalayas can be seen from this place. Like any other villages, main occupation of people living here is agriculture and cattle farming. Villagers sell vegetables, dairy products, and cattle's to nearby places like Dhulikhel, Banepa and even to the Capital city Kathmandy. Whereas many people are governmental officials. As the village is near to the District Headquarter Dhulikhel, slowly this village is developing. All types of infrastructure has been established. Life standard of people is increasing. 72.35% of  people are literate. This village has a Government School 'Shree Karthari Secondary School' estd. 2009 B.S.

Media
To Promote local culture, Kavre district has one Television Broadcast Channel "Araniko T.V" and three local FM radio stations,
Radio Namobuddha  - 106.7 MHz, Radio ABC - 89.8 MHz which is a Community Radio Station and Prime Fm - 104.5 MHz. This place also has good access of most of the radio stations from Kathmandu and other parts of Nepal.

Kavre(common name for Kavre Nitya CHandeshwor) has a local channel distributor company which is currently providing service to around 100 subscribers from 9 V.D.C's. Kavre also has a good coverage of mobile phone Networks like NTC and N-Cell. Cell-phone is easily available to almost every people.

References
Rupa

External links
UN map of the municipalities of Kavrepalanchowk District

Populated places in Kavrepalanchok District